The Paris Peace Conference was the formal meeting in 1919 and 1920 of the victorious Allies after the end of World War I to set the peace terms for the defeated Central Powers. Dominated by the leaders of Britain, France, the United States and Italy, it resulted in five treaties that rearranged the maps of Europe and parts of Asia, Africa and the Pacific Islands, and also imposed financial penalties. Germany and the other losing nations had no voice in the Conference's deliberations; this gave rise to political resentments that lasted for decades.

The conference involved diplomats from 32 countries and nationalities. Its major decisions were the creation of the League of Nations and the five peace treaties with the defeated states; the awarding of German and Ottoman overseas possessions as "mandates", chiefly to Britain and France; the imposition of reparations upon Germany; and the drawing of new national boundaries, sometimes involving plebiscites, to reflect ethnic boundaries more closely. Wilsonian goals, stated in the Fourteen Points, became the basis for the terms of the German surrender during the conference, as it had earlier been the basis of the German government's negotiations in the Armistice of 11 November 1918.

The main result was the Treaty of Versailles with Germany; Article 231 of the treaty placed the whole guilt for the war on "the aggression of Germany and her allies". That provision proved very humiliating for Germany, and set the stage for the expensive reparations that Germany was intended to pay (it paid only a small portion before its last payment in 1931). The five great powers (France, Britain, Italy, Japan and the United States) controlled the Conference. The "Big Four" were French Prime Minister Georges Clemenceau, British Prime Minister David Lloyd George, US President Woodrow Wilson, and Italian Prime Minister Vittorio Emanuele Orlando. They met informally 145 times and made all major decisions before they were ratified.

The conference began on 18 January 1919. With respect to its end, Professor Michael Neiberg noted, "Although the senior statesmen stopped working personally on the conference in June 1919, the formal peace process did not really end until July 1923, when the Treaty of Lausanne was signed." It is often referred to as the "Versailles Conference", although only the signing of the first treaty took place there in the historic palace; the negotiations occurred at the Quai d'Orsay in Paris.

Overview and direct results

The Conference formally opened on 18 January 1919 at the Quai d’Orsay in Paris.  This date was symbolic, as it was the anniversary of the proclamation of William I as German Emperor in 1871, in the Hall of Mirrors at the Palace of Versailles, shortly before the end of the Siege of Paris - a day itself imbued with significance in its turn in Germany as the anniversary of the establishment of the Kingdom of Prussia in 1701.
The Delegates from 27 nations (delegates representing 5 nationalities were for the most part ignored) were assigned to 52 commissions, which held 1,646 sessions to prepare reports, with the help of many experts, on topics ranging from prisoners of war to undersea cables, to international aviation, to responsibility for the war. Key recommendations were folded into the Treaty of Versailles with Germany, which had 15 chapters and 440 clauses, as well as treaties for the other defeated nations.

The five major powers (France, Britain, Italy, the U.S., and Japan) controlled the Conference. Amongst the "Big Five", in practice Japan only sent a former prime minister and played a small role; and the "Big Four" leaders dominated the conference.
The four met together informally 145 times and made all the major decisions, which in turn were ratified by other attendees. The open meetings of all the delegations approved the decisions made by the Big Four. The conference came to an end on 21 January 1920 with the inaugural General Assembly of the League of Nations.

Five major peace treaties were prepared at the Paris Peace Conference (with, in parentheses, the affected countries):
 the Treaty of Versailles, 28 June 1919 (Germany)
 the Treaty of Saint-Germain, 10 September 1919 (Austria)
 the Treaty of Neuilly, 27 November 1919 (Bulgaria)
 the Treaty of Trianon, 4 June 1920 (Hungary)
 the Treaty of Sèvres, 10 August 1920; subsequently revised by the Treaty of Lausanne, 24 July 1923 (Ottoman Empire/Republic of Turkey).

The major decisions were the establishment of the League of Nations; the five peace treaties with defeated enemies; the awarding of German and Ottoman overseas possessions as "mandates", chiefly to members of the British Empire and to France; reparations imposed on Germany; and the drawing of new national boundaries (sometimes with plebiscites) to better reflect the forces of nationalism. The main result was the Treaty of Versailles, with Germany, which in section 231 laid the guilt for the war on "the aggression of Germany and her allies". This provision proved humiliating for Germany and set the stage for very high reparations Germany was supposed to pay (it paid only a small portion before reparations ended in 1931).

As the conference's decisions were enacted unilaterally and largely on the whims of the Big Four, Paris was effectively the center of a world government during the conference, which deliberated over and implemented the sweeping changes to the political geography of Europe. Most famously, the Treaty of Versailles itself weakened the German military and placed full blame for the war and costly reparations on Germany's shoulders, and the later humiliation and resentment in Germany is often sometimes considered by historians to be one of the direct causes of Nazi Party's electoral successes and one of the indirect causes of World War II. The League of Nations proved controversial in the United States since critics said it subverted the powers of the US Congress to declare war; the US Senate did not ratify any of the peace treaties and so the United States never joined the League. Instead, the 1921-1923 Harding administration concluded new treaties with Germany, Austria, and Hungary. The German Weimar Republic was not invited to attend the conference at Versailles. Representatives of White Russia but not Communist Russia were at the conference. Numerous other nations sent delegations to appeal for various unsuccessful additions to the treaties, and parties lobbied for causes ranging from independence for the countries of the South Caucasus to Japan's unsuccessful proposal for racial equality to the other great powers.

Mandates
A central issue of the conference was the disposition of the overseas colonies of Germany (Austria-Hungary did not have major colonies, and the Ottoman Empire was a separate issue).

The British dominions wanted their reward for their sacrifice. Australia wanted New Guinea, New Zealand wanted Samoa, and South Africa wanted South West Africa. Wilson wanted the League to administer all German colonies until they were ready for independence. Lloyd George realized he needed to support his dominions and so he proposed a compromise: there be three types of mandates. Mandates for the Turkish provinces were one category and would be divided up between Britain and France.

The second category, of New Guinea, Samoa, and South West Africa, were located so close to responsible supervisors that the mandates could hardly be given to anyone except Australia, New Zealand, and South Africa. Finally, the African colonies would need the careful supervision as "Class B" mandates, which could be provided only by experienced colonial powers: Britain, France, and Belgium although Italy and Portugal received small amounts of territory. Wilson and the others finally went along with the solution. The dominions received "Class C Mandates" to the colonies that they wanted. Japan obtained mandates over German possessions north of the Equator.

Wilson wanted no mandates for the United States, but his main advisor, Colonel House, was deeply involved in awarding the others. Wilson was especially offended by Australian demands and had some memorable clashes with Hughes (the Australian Prime Minister), this the most famous:

British approach

The maintenance of the unity, territories, and interests of the British Empire was an overarching concern for the British delegates to the conference, but they entered the conference with more specific goals with this order of priority:
 Ensuring the security of France
 Removing the threat of the German High Seas Fleet
 Settling territorial contentions
 Supporting the League of Nations

The Racial Equality Proposal, put forth by the Japanese did not directly conflict with any core British interest, but as the conference progressed, its full implications on immigration to the British dominions, with Australia taking particular exception, would become a major point of contention within the delegation.

Ultimately, Britain did not see the proposal as being one of the fundamental aims of the conference. Its delegation was, therefore, willing to sacrifice the proposal to placate the Australian delegation and thus help to satisfy its overarching aim of preserving the empire's unity.

Britain had reluctantly consented to the attendance of separate dominion delegations, but the British managed to rebuff attempts by the envoys of the newly proclaimed Irish Republic to put its case to the conference for self-determination, diplomatic recognition, and membership of the proposed League of Nations. The Irish envoys' final "Demand for Recognition" in a letter to Clemenceau, the chairman, was not answered. Britain planned to legislate for two Irish Home Rule states, within the United Kingdom and so without dominion status, and accordingly passed the Government of Ireland Act 1920. Irish nationalists were generally unpopular with the Allies in 1919 because of their anti-war stance during the Conscription Crisis of 1918.

David Lloyd George commented that he did "not do badly" at the peace conference "considering I was seated between Jesus Christ and Napoleon." This was a reference to the great idealism of Wilson, who desired a lenient peace with Germany, and the stark realism of Clemenceau, who was determined to see Germany punished.

Dominion representation

The dominion governments were not originally given separate invitations to the conference but were expected to send representatives as part of the British delegation.

Convinced that Canada had become a nation on the battlefields of Europe, Prime Minister Sir Robert Borden demanded that it have a separate seat at the conference. That was initially opposed not only by Britain but also by the United States, which saw a Dominion delegation as an extra British vote. Borden responded by pointing out that since Canada had lost nearly 60,000 men, a far larger proportion of its men than the 50,000 American men lost, it had at least the right to the representation of a "minor" power. Lloyd George eventually relented, and persuaded the reluctant Americans to accept the presence of delegations from Canada, India, Australia, Newfoundland, New Zealand, and South Africa and that those countries receive their own seats in the League of Nations.

Canada, despite its huge losses in the war, did not ask for either reparations or mandates.

The Australian delegation, led by Australian Prime Minister Billy Hughes fought greatly for its demands: reparations, the annexation of German New Guinea, and the rejection of the Racial Equality Proposal. He said that he had no objection to the proposal if it was stated in unambiguous terms that it did not confer any right to enter Australia. He was concerned by the rise of Japan. Within months of the declaration of war in 1914, Japan, Australia, and New Zealand had seized all of Germany's possessions in the Far East and the Pacific Ocean. Japan occupied German possessions with the blessings of the British, but Hughes was alarmed by the policy.

French approach

French Prime Minister, Georges Clemenceau controlled his delegation, and his chief goal was to weaken Germany militarily, strategically, and economically. Having personally witnessed two German attacks on French soil in the last 40 years, he was adamant for Germany not to be permitted to attack France again. Particularly, Clemenceau sought an American and British joint guarantee of French security in the event of another German attack.

Clemenceau also expressed skepticism and frustration with Wilson's Fourteen Points and complained: "Mr. Wilson bores me with his fourteen points. Why, God Almighty has only ten!" Wilson won a few points by signing a mutual defense treaty with France, but he did not present it to the Senate for ratification and so it never took effect.

Another possible French policy was to seek a rapprochement with Germany. In May 1919 the diplomat René Massigli was sent on several secret missions to Berlin. During his visits, he offered, on the behalf of his government, to revise the territorial and economic clauses of the upcoming peace treaty. Massigli spoke of the desirability of "practical, verbal discussions" between French and German officials that would lead to a "Franco-German collaboration." Furthermore, Massagli told the Germans that the French thought of the "Anglo-Saxon powers" (the United States and the British Empire) to be the major threat to France in the post-war world. He argued that both France and Germany had a joint interest in opposing "Anglo-Saxon domination" of the world, and he warned that the "deepening of opposition" between the French and the Germans "would lead to the ruin of both countries, to the advantage of the Anglo-Saxon powers."

The Germans rejected the French offers because they considered the French overtures to be a trap to trick them into accepting the Treaty of Versailles unchanged; also, German Foreign Minister, Count Ulrich von Brockdorff-Rantzau thought that the United States was more likely to reduce the severity of the peace treaty than France was. Eventually, it became Lloyd George who pushed for better terms for Germany.

Italian approach

In 1914, Italy remained neutral despite the Triple Alliance with Germany and Austria-Hungary. In 1915, it joined the Allies to gain the territories promised by the Triple Entente in the secret Treaty of London: Trentino, the Tyrol as far as Brenner, Trieste, Istria, most of the Dalmatian Coast (except Fiume), Valona, a protectorate over Albania, Antalya (in Turkey), and possibly colonies in Africa.

Italian Prime Minister Vittorio Emanuele Orlando tried to obtain full implementation of the Treaty of London, as agreed by France and Britain before the war. He had popular support because of the loss of 700,000 soldiers and a budget deficit of 12,000,000,000 Italian lire during the war made both the government and people feel entitled to all of those territories and even others not mentioned in the Treaty of London, particularly Fiume, which many Italians believed should be annexed to Italy because of the city's Italian population.

Orlando, unable to speak English, conducted negotiations jointly with his Foreign Minister Sidney Sonnino, a Protestant of British origins who spoke the language. Together, they worked primarily to secure the partition of the Habsburg monarchy. At the conference, Italy gained Istria, Trieste, Trentino, and South Tyrol. Most of Dalmatia, however, was given to the Kingdom of Serbs, Croats and Slovenes, and Fiume remained disputed territory, causing a nationalist outrage. Orlando obtained other results, such as the permanent membership of Italy in the League of Nations and the promise by the Allies to transfer British Jubaland and the French Aozou strip to Italian colonies. Protectorates over Albania and Antalya were also recognized, but nationalists considered the war to be a mutilated victory, and Orlando was ultimately forced to abandon the conference and to resign. Francesco Saverio Nitti took his place and signed the treaties.

There was a general disappointment in Italy, which the nationalists and fascists used to build the idea that Italy was betrayed by the Allies and refused what had been promised. That was a cause for the general rise of Italian fascism. Orlando refused to see the war as a mutilated victory and replied to nationalists calling for a greater expansion, "Italy today is a great state... on par with the great historic and contemporary states. This is, for me, our main and principal expansion."

Japanese approach

Japan sent a large delegation, headed by the former Prime Minister, Marquis Saionji Kinmochi. It was originally one of the "big five" but relinquished that role because of its slight interest in European affairs. Instead, it focused on two demands: the inclusion of its Racial Equality Proposal in the League's Covenant and Japanese territorial claims with respect to former German colonies: Shantung (including Kiaochow) and the Pacific islands north of the Equator (the Marshall Islands, Micronesia, the Mariana Islands, and the Carolines). The former Foreign Minister Baron Makino Nobuaki was de facto chief, and Saionji's role was symbolic and limited because of his history of ill-health. The Japanese delegation became unhappy after it had received only half of the rights of Germany, and it then walked out of the conference.

Racial equality proposal

During the negotiations, the leader of the Japanese delegation, Saionji Kinmochi, proposed the inclusion of a "racial equality clause" in the Covenant of the League of Nations on 13 February as an amendment to Article 21.:
The equality of nations being a basic principle of the League of Nations, the High Contracting Parties agree to accord as soon as possible to all alien nationals of states, members of the League, equal and just treatment in every respect making no distinction, either in law or in fact, on account of their race or nationality.

The clause quickly proved problematic to both the American and British delegations. Though the proposal itself was compatible with Britain's stance of nominal equality for all British subjects as a principle for maintaining imperial unity, there were significant deviations in the stated interests of its dominions, notably Australia and South Africa. Though both dominions could not vote on the decision individually, they were strongly opposed to the clause and pressured Britain to do likewise. Ultimately, the British delegation succumbed to imperial pressure and abstained from voting for the clause. Meanwhile, though Wilson was indifferent to the clause, there was fierce resistance to it from the American public, and he ruled as Conference chairman that a unanimous vote was required for the Japanese proposal to pass. Ultimately, on the day of the vote, only 11 of the 17 delegates voted in favor of the proposal. The defeat of the proposal influenced Japan's turn from co-operation with the Western world into more nationalist and militarist policies and approaches.

Territorial claims
The Japanese claim to Shantung faced strong challenges from the Chinese patriotic student group. In 1914, at the outset of the war, Japan had seized the territory that had been granted to Germany in 1897 and also seized the German islands in the Pacific north of the equator. In 1917, Japan had made secret agreements with Britain, France, and Italy to guarantee their annexation of these territories. With Britain, there was an agreement to support British annexation of the Pacific Islands south of the Equator. Despite a generally pro-Chinese view by the American delegation, Article 156 of the Treaty of Versailles transferred German concessions in the Jiaozhou Bay, China, to Japan rather than returning sovereign authority to China. The leader of the Chinese delegation, Lou Tseng-Tsiang, demanded a reservation be inserted before he would sign the treaty. After the reservation was denied, the treaty was signed by all the delegations except that of China. Chinese outrage over that provision led to demonstrations known as the May Fourth Movement. The Pacific Islands north of the equator became a class C mandate, administered by Japan.

American approach

Until Wilson's arrival in Europe in December 1918, no sitting American president had ever visited the continent. Wilson's 1917 Fourteen Points, had helped win many hearts and minds as the war ended in America and all over Europe, including Germany, as well as its allies in and the former subjects of the Ottoman Empire.

Wilson's diplomacy and his Fourteen Points had essentially established the conditions for the armistices that had brought an end to World War I. Wilson felt it to be his duty and obligation to the people of the world to be a prominent figure at the peace negotiations. High hopes and expectations were placed on him to deliver what he had promised for the postwar era. In doing so, Wilson ultimately began to lead the foreign policy of the United States towards interventionism, a move that has been strongly resisted in some domestic circles ever since.

Once Wilson arrived, however, he found "rivalries, and conflicting claims previously submerged." He worked mostly trying to sway the direction that the French, led by Georges Clemenceau, and the British, led by David Lloyd George, towards Germany and its allies in Europe and the former Ottoman Empire in the Middle East. Wilson's attempts to gain acceptance of his Fourteen Points ultimately failed after France and Britain had refused to adopt some of their specific points and core principles.

In Europe, several of his Fourteen Points conflicted with the other powers' desires. The United States did not encourage or believe that the responsibility for the war, which Article 231 of the Treaty of Versailles, placed on Germany alone, was fair or warranted. It would not be until 1921, under US President Warren Harding, that the United States finally signed peace treaties with the Central Powers, separately, with Germany, Austria, and Hungary respectively.

In the Middle East, negotiations were complicated by competing aims and claims, and the new mandate system. The United States hoped to establish a more liberal and diplomatic world, as stated in the Fourteen Points, in which democracy, sovereignty, liberty and self-determination would be respected. France and Britain, on the other hand, already controlled empires, wielded power over their subjects around the world, and still aspired to be dominant colonial powers.

In the light of the previously-secret Sykes–Picot Agreement and following the adoption of the mandate system on the Arab provinces of the former Ottoman Empire, the conference heard statements from competing Zionists and Arabs. Wilson then recommended an international commission of inquiry to ascertain the wishes of the local inhabitants. The idea, first accepted by Great Britain and France, was later rejected but became the purely-American King–Crane Commission, which toured all Syria and Palestine during the summer of 1919, took statements, and sampled opinion. Its report, presented to Wilson, was kept secret from the public until The New York Times broke the story in December 1922. A pro-Zionist joint resolution on Palestine was passed by Congress in September 1922.

France and Britain tried to appease Wilson by consenting to the establishment of his League of Nations. However, because isolationist sentiment was strong, and some of the articles in the League Charter conflicted with the US Constitution, the United States never ratified the Treaty of Versailles or joined the League that Wilson had helped to create to further peace by diplomacy, rather than war, and the conditions that can breed peace.

Greek approach
Greek Prime Minister Eleftherios Venizelos took part in the conference as Greece's chief representative. Wilson was said to have placed Venizelos first for personal ability among all delegates in Paris.

Venizelos proposed Greek expansion in Thrace and Asia Minor, which had been part of the defeated Kingdom of Bulgaria and the Ottoman Empire; Northern Epirus, Imvros; and Tenedos for the realization of the Megali Idea. He also reached the Venizelos-Tittoni agreement with the Italians on the cession of the Dodecanese (apart from Rhodes) to Greece. For the Pontic Greeks, he proposed a common Pontic-Armenian state.

As a liberal politician, Venizelos was a strong supporter of the Fourteen Points and the League of Nations.

Chinese approach
The Chinese delegation was led by Lou Tseng-Tsiang, who was accompanied by Wellington Koo and Cao Rulin.  Koo demanded Germany's concessions on Shandong be returned to China. He also called for an end to imperialist institutions such as extraterritoriality, legation guards, and foreign leaseholds. Despite American support and the ostensible spirit of self-determination, the Western powers refused his claims but instead transferred the German concessions to Japan. That sparked widespread student protests in China on 4 May, later known as the May Fourth Movement, which eventually pressured the government into refusing to sign the Treaty of Versailles. Thus, the Chinese delegation at the conference was the only one not to sign the treaty at the signing ceremony.

Other nations' approach

All-Russian Government (Whites)
While Russia was formally excluded from the Conference although it had fought against the Central Powers for three years. However the Russian Provincial Council (chaired by Prince Lvov), the successor to the Russian Constituent Assembly and the political arm of the Russian White movement attended the conference and was represented by the former tsarist minister Sergey Sazonov, who, if the Tsar had not been overthrown, would most likely have attended the conference anyway. The Council maintained the position of an indivisible Russia, but some were prepared to negotiate over the loss of Poland and Finland. The Council suggested all matters relating to territorial claims or demands for autonomy within the former Russian Empire be referred to a new All-Russian Constituent Assembly.

Baltic States
Delegations from the Baltic States of Estonia, Latvia and Lithuania, led respectively by Jaan Poska, Jānis Čakste and Augustinas Voldemaras, also participated in the conference, and successfully achieved international recognition of the independence of Estonia, Latvia and Lithuania.

Ukraine

Ukraine had its best opportunity to win recognition and support from foreign powers at the conference. At a meeting of the Big Five on 16 January, Lloyd George called Ukrainian leader Symon Petliura (1874–1926) an adventurer and dismissed Ukraine as an anti-Bolshevik stronghold. Sir Eyre Crowe, British Undersecretary of State for Foreign Affairs, spoke against a union of East Galicia and Poland. The British cabinet never decided whether to support a united or dismembered Russia. The United States was sympathetic to a strong, united Russia, as a counterpoise to Japan, but Britain feared a threat to India. Petliura appointed Count Tyshkevich as his representative to the Vatican, and Pope Benedict XV recognized Ukrainian independence, but Ukraine was effectively ignored.

Belarus
A delegation of the Belarusian Democratic Republic, under Prime Minister Anton Łuckievič, also participated in the conference, and attempted to gain international recognition of the independence of Belarus. On the way to the conference, the delegation was received by Czechoslovak President Tomáš Masaryk in Prague. During the conference, Łuckievič had meetings with the exiled foreign minister of Admiral Alexander Kolchak's Russian government, Sergey Sazonov, and Polish Prime Minister Ignacy Jan Paderewski.

Minority rights

At the insistence of Wilson, the Big Four required Poland to sign a treaty on 28 June 1919 that guaranteed minority rights in the new nation. Poland signed under protest and made little effort to enforce the specified rights for Germans, Jews, Ukrainians, and other minorities. Similar treaties were signed by Czechoslovakia, Romania, Yugoslavia, Greece, Austria, Hungary, and Bulgaria and later by Latvia, Estonia, and Lithuania. Estonia had already given cultural autonomy to minorities in its declaration of independence. Finland and Germany were not asked to sign a minority treaty.

In Poland, the key provisions were to become fundamental laws, which would override any national legal codes or legislation. The new country pledged to assure "full and complete protection of life and liberty to all individuals... without distinction of birth, nationality, language, race, or religion." Freedom of religion was guaranteed to everyone. Most residents were given citizenship, but there was considerable ambiguity on who was covered. The treaty guaranteed basic civil, political, and cultural rights and required all citizens to be equal before the law and enjoy identical rights of citizens and workers. Polish was to be the national language, but the treaty provided for minority languages to be freely used privately, in commerce, in religion, in the press, at public meetings, and before all courts. Minorities were to be permitted to establish and control at their own expense private charities, churches, social institutions, and schools, without interference from the government, which was required to set up German-language public schools in districts that had been German before the war. All education above the primary level was to be conducted exclusively in the national language. Article 12 was the enforcement clause and gave the Council of the League of Nations the responsibility to monitor and enforce the treaties.

Caucasus

The three South Caucasian republics of Armenia, Azerbaijan, and Georgia and the Mountainous Republic of the Northern Caucasus all sent a delegation to the conference. Their attempts to gain protection from threats posed by the ongoing Russian Civil War largely failed since none of the major powers was interested in taking a mandate over the Caucasian territories. After a series of delays, the three South Caucasian countries ultimately gained de facto recognition from the Supreme Council of the Allied powers but only after all European troops had been withdrawn from the Caucasus, except for a British contingent in Batumi. Georgia was recognized de facto on 12 January 1920, followed by Azerbaijan the same day and Armenia on 19 January 1920. The Allied leaders decided to limit their assistance to the Caucasian republics to the supply of arms, munitions, and food.

The Armenian delegation included Avetis Aharonyan, Hamo Ohanjanyan, and Armen Garo. The Azerbaijani mission was headed by Alimardan Topchubashev and included Mammad Hasan Hajinski, Akbar agha Sheykhulislamov, Ahmet Ağaoğlu and Mahammad Amin Rasulzade, first president of Azerbaijan Democratic Republic. The Georgian delegation included Nikolay Chkheidze, Irakli Tsereteli, and Zurab Avalishvili.

Korea

After a failed attempt by the Korean National Association to send a three-man delegation to Paris, a delegation of Koreans from China and Hawaii made it there. It included a representative from the Korean Provisional Government in Shanghai, Kim Kyu-sik. They were aided by the Chinese, who were eager for the opportunity to embarrass Japan at the international forum. Several top Chinese leaders at the time, including Sun Yat-sen, told US diplomats that the conference should take up the question of Korean independence. However, the Chinese, already locked in a struggle against the Japanese, could do little else for Korea. Other than China, no nation took the Koreans seriously at the conference because it already had the status of a Japanese colony. The failure of Korean nationalists to gain support from the conference ended their hopes of foreign support.

Palestine

After the conference's decision to separate the former Arab provinces from the Ottoman Empire and to apply the new mandate-system to them, the World Zionist Organization submitted its draft resolutions for consideration by the conference.

The February 1919 statement included the following main points: recognition of Jewish "title" over the land, a declaration of the borders (significantly larger than in the prior Sykes-Picot agreement), and League of Nations sovereignty under British mandate. An offshoot of the conference was convened at San Remo in 1920, leading to the creation of the Mandate for Palestine, which was to come into force in 1923.

Aromanians
During the Peace Conference, a delegation of Aromanians participated in the talks in order to fulfill autonomist wishes for the Aromanian people in the same vein as the Principality of the Pindus attempt two years earlier, but failed to accomplish any recognition for the self-rule desires of their people.

Women's approach
An unprecedented aspect of the conference was concerted pressure brought to bear on delegates by a committee of women, who sought to establish and entrench women's fundamental social, economic, and political rights, such as that of suffrage, within the peace framework. Although they were denied seats at the Paris Conference, the leadership of Marguerite de Witt-Schlumberger, the president of the French Union for Women's Suffrage, caused an Inter-Allied Women's Conference (IAWC) to be convened, which met from 10 February to 10 April 1919. The IAWC lobbied Wilson and then also the other delegates of the Paris Conference to admit women to its committees, and it was successful in achieving a hearing from the conference's Commissions for International Labour Legislation and then the League of Nations Commission. One key and concrete outcome of the IAWC's work was Article 7 of the Covenant of the League of Nations: "All positions under or in connection with the League, including the Secretariat, shall be open equally to men and women." More generally, the IAWC placed the issue of women's rights at the center of the new world order that was established in Paris.

Historical assessments

The remaking of the world map at the conferences gave birth to a number of critical conflict-prone contradictions internationally that would become some of the causes of World War II. The British historian Eric Hobsbawm claimed: 

Hobsbawm and other left-wing historians have argued that Wilson's Fourteen Points, particularly the principle of self-determination, were measures that were primarily against the Bolsheviks and designed, by playing the nationalist card, to tame the revolutionary fever that was sweeping across Europe in the wake of the October Revolution and the end of the war:

The right-wing historian John Lewis Gaddis agreed: "When Woodrow Wilson made the principle of self-determination one of his Fourteen Points his intent had been to undercut the appeal of Bolshevism."

That view has a long history and can be summarised by Ray Stannard Baker's famous remark: "Paris cannot be understood without Moscow."

The British historian Antony Lentin viewed Lloyd George's role in Paris as a major success:

Cultural references

 British official artists William Orpen and Augustus John were present at the Conference.
 World's End (1940), the first novel in Upton Sinclair's Pulitzer Prize-winning Lanny Budd series, describes the political machinations and consequences of the Paris Peace Conference through much of the book's second half, with Sinclair's narrative including many historically accurate characters and events.
 The first two books of novelist Robert Goddard's The Wide World trilogy (The Ways of the World and The Corners of the Globe) are centered around the diplomatic machinations which form the background to the conference.
 Paris 1919 (1973), the third studio album by Welsh musician John Cale, is named after the Paris Peace Conference, and its title song explores various aspects of early-20th-century culture and history in Western Europe.
 A Dangerous Man: Lawrence After Arabia (1992) is a British television film starring Ralph Fiennes as T. E. Lawrence and Alexander Siddig as Emir Faisal, depicting their struggles to secure an independent Arab state at the conference.
 "Paris, May 1919" is a 1993 episode of The Young Indiana Jones Chronicles, written by Jonathan Hales and directed by David Hare, in which Indiana Jones is shown working as a translator with the American delegation at the Paris Peace Conference.

See also

 Commission of Responsibilities
 Congress of Vienna
 Czech Corridor
 International relations of the Great Powers (1814–1919)
 The Inquiry
 Minority Treaties
 Congress of Oppressed Nationalities of the Austro-Hungarian Empire

References

Further reading

 
 Albrecht-Carrie, Rene. Italy at the Paris Peace Conference (1938) 
 Ambrosius, Lloyd E. Woodrow Wilson and the American Diplomatic Tradition: The Treaty Fight in Perspective (1990)
 Andelman, David A. A Shattered Peace: Versailles 1919 and the Price We Pay Today (2007) popular history that stresses multiple long-term disasters caused by Treaty.
 Bailey; Thomas A. Wilson and the Peacemakers: Combining Woodrow Wilson and the Lost Peace and Woodrow Wilson and the Great Betrayal (1947) 
 Birdsall, Paul. Versailles twenty years after (1941) well balanced older account
 Boemeke, Manfred F., et al., eds. The Treaty of Versailles: A Reassessment after 75 Years (1998). A major collection of important papers by scholars
 Bruce, Scot David, Woodrow Wilson's Colonial Emissary: Edward M. House and the Origins of the Mandate System, 1917–1919 (University of Nebraska Press, 2013).
 Clements, Kendrick, A. Woodrow Wilson: World Statesman (1999).
 Cornelissen, Christoph, and Arndt Weinrich, eds. Writing the Great War - The Historiography of World War I from 1918 to the Present (2020) free download; full coverage for major countries.
 Cooper, John Milton. Woodrow Wilson: A Biography (2009), scholarly biography; pp 439–532 excerpt and text search
 Dillon, Emile Joseph. The Inside Story of the Peace Conference, (1920) online
 Dockrill, Michael, and John Fisher. The Paris Peace Conference, 1919: Peace Without Victory? (Springer, 2016).
 Ferguson, Niall. The Pity of War: Explaining World War One  (1999), economics issues at Paris pp 395–432
 Doumanis, Nicholas, ed. The Oxford Handbook of European History, 1914–1945 (2016) ch 9.
 Fromkin, David. A Peace to End All Peace, The Fall of the Ottoman Empire and the Creation of the Modern Middle East, Macmillan 1989.
 
 Gelfand, Lawrence Emerson. The Inquiry: American Preparations for Peace, 1917–1919 (Yale UP, 1963).
 Ginneken, Anique H.M. van. Historical Dictionary of the League of Nations (2006)\
 Greene, Theodore, ed. Wilson At Versailles (1949) short excerpts from scholarly studies. online free
 Henderson, W. O. "The Peace Settlement, 1919" History 26.101 (1941): 60–69.online historiography
 Henig, Ruth. Versailles and After: 1919–1933 (2nd ed. 1995), 100 pages; brief introduction by scholar
 
 
 Keynes, John Maynard, The Economic Consequences of the Peace (1920) famous criticism by leading economist full text online
 Dimitri Kitsikis, Le rôle des experts à la Conférence de la Paix de 1919, Ottawa, éditions de l'université d'Ottawa, 1972.
 Dimitri Kitsikis, Propagande et pressions en politique internationale. La Grèce et ses revendications à la Conférence de la Paix, 1919–1920, Paris, Presses universitaires de France, 1963.
 Knock, Thomas J. To End All Wars: Woodrow Wilson and the Quest for a New World Order (1995)
 Lederer, Ivo J., ed. The Versailles Settlement—Was It Foredoomed to Failure? (1960) short excerpts from scholars 
 Lentin, Antony. Guilt at Versailles: Lloyd George and the Pre-history of Appeasement (1985)
 Lentin, Antony. Lloyd George and the Lost Peace: From Versailles to Hitler, 1919–1940 (2004)
 
 Macalister-Smith, Peter, Schwietzke, Joachim: Diplomatic Conferences and Congresses. A Bibliographical Compendium of State Practice 1642 to 1919, W. Neugebauer, Graz, Feldkirch 2017, .
 
 MacMillan, Margaret. Peacemakers: The Paris Peace Conference of 1919 and Its Attempt to End War (2001), also published as Paris 1919: Six Months That Changed the World (2003); influential survey
 
 
 Paxton, Robert O., and Julie Hessler. Europe in the Twentieth Century (2011) pp 141–78
 Marks, Sally. The Illusion of Peace: International Relations in Europe 1918–1933 (2nd ed. 2003)
 Marks, Sally. "Mistakes and Myths: The Allies, Germany, and the versailles treaty, 1918–1921." Journal of Modern History 85.3 (2013): 632–659. online
 Mayer, Arno J., Politics and Diplomacy of Peacemaking: Containment and Counter-revolution at Versailles, 1918–1919 (1967), leftist
 Newton, Douglas. British Policy and the Weimar Republic, 1918–1919 (1997). 484 pgs.
 
 Roberts, Priscilla. "Wilson, Europe's Colonial Empires, and the Issue of Imperialism," in Ross A. Kennedy, ed., A Companion to Woodrow Wilson (2013) pp: 492–517.
 Schwabe, Klaus. Woodrow Wilson, Revolutionary Germany, and Peacemaking, 1918–1919: Missionary Diplomacy and the Realities of Power (1985) 
 Sharp, Alan. The Versailles Settlement: Peacemaking after the First World War, 1919–1923 (2nd ed. 2008)
 
 Naoko Shimazu (1998), Japan, Race and Equality, Routledge, 
 Steiner, Zara. The Lights that Failed: European International History 1919–1933 (Oxford History of Modern Europe) (2007), pp 15–79; major scholarly work 
 
 Walworth, Arthur. Wilson and His Peacemakers: American Diplomacy at the Paris Peace Conference, 1919 (1986) 618pp 
 ;  904pp; full scale scholarly biography; winner of Pulitzer Prize; online free; 2nd ed. 1965
 Watson, David Robin. George Clemenceau: A Political Biography (1976) 463 pgs.
 Xu, Guoqi. Asia and the Great War – A Shared History (Oxford UP, 2016) online

External links

 Seating Plan of the Paris Peace Conference - UK Parliament Living Heritage
 Frances Stevenson - Paris Peace Conference Diary - UK Parliament Living Heritage
 Frances Stevenson - Paris Peace Conference ID Card - UK Parliament Living Heritage
 Sharp, Alan: The Paris Peace Conference and its Consequences , in: 1914-1918-online. International Encyclopedia of the First World War.
 Excerpts from the NFB documentary Paris 1919
 Sampling of maps used by the American delegates held by the American Geographical Society Library, UW Milwaukee

 
1919 in international relations
1919 conferences
Georges Clemenceau
Presidency of Woodrow Wilson
Peace
1919 in Paris
20th-century diplomatic conferences
Diplomatic conferences in France
David Lloyd George